Whitewood Airport  is adjacent to Whitewood, Saskatchewan, Canada.

See also 
 List of airports in Saskatchewan

References 

Registered aerodromes in Saskatchewan
Whitewood, Saskatchewan